The Roll the Bones Tour was a concert tour by Canadian rock band Rush in support of their fourteenth studio album Roll the Bones.

Background
The tour kicked off October 25, 1991 at Copps Coliseum in Hamilton, Ontario and culminated on June 28, 1992 at the World Music Theater in Tinley Park, Illinois, estimated to have performed to more than 960,000 fans. Guitarist Eric Johnson was the initial opening act in the autumn of 1991, following the band losing a Grammy nomination for "Where's My Thing?" to Johnson's "Cliffs of Dover". American rock band Primus were the opening act for Rush later on this tour when Johnson canceled his last two weeks on the first leg as an opening act, as well as Vinnie Moore and Mr. Big. Opening for the band's hometown show in Toronto, Ontario on December 16 was The Tragically Hip.

In Sacramento on January 27, 1992, the band performed their worst show, as they performed to an unruly audience who threw objects at the band throughout the performance. Prior to the show, Rush refused to perform "general admission" performances due to potential injury and death in the crowd, but was booked to perform the show and was unexpectedly general admission.

Reception
The Pittsburgh Post-Gazettes John Hayes, reviewing the Pittsburgh performance on October 28, 1991, opened that Rush had found an effective formula that held the attention of rock fans after the release of twenty albums and a long history of successful concert tours, later stating that the shows are kept alive by the "sheer talent" of the band members. Notifying the Roll the Bones Tour as one of the biggest productions on the road, he acknowledged the stage's usage of lasers, lighting, special effects, a rotating drum platform during Peart's solo and inflatable rabbits throughout the show.

Reviewing the Burgettstown concert on June 21, 1992, Kurt Bruner of the Observer-Reporter opened that the trio pulled no punches and was a knockout, sending the audience who was predominantly late 20s to middle aged reeling. He expressed on the usage of special effects and lighting, praising its usage in highlighting the songs performed, as well as the choreographed lasers and lights during Peart's drum solo, which he also noted as "outstanding", "superb" and as one of the memorable aspects of the show. He acknowledged the band, stating that they looked to be enjoying themselves without exerting much effort - as well as praising the stage design as simple, with only a ramp featured around the band.

Set list
This is an example setlist adapted from Rush: Wandering the Face of the Earth – The Official Touring History of what were performed during the tour, but may not represent the majority of the shows. For the encore, the band performed a medley of older material, which would a feature a minute of each song for the medley.

"Force Ten"
"Limelight"
"Freewill"
"Distant Early Warning"
"Time Stand Still"
"Dreamline"
"Bravado"
"Roll the Bones"
"Show Don't Tell"
"The Big Money"
"Ghost of a Chance"
"Subdivisions"
"The Pass"
"The Trees"
"Where's My Thing?" 
"The Rhythm Method" (drum solo)
"Closer to the Heart"
"Xanadu"
"Superconductor"
"Tom Sawyer"
Encore
"The Spirit of Radio"
Medley: "2112" (Overture) / "Finding My Way" / "La Villa Strangiato" / "Anthem" / "Red Barchetta" / "The Spirit of Radio" (reprise)
"Cygnus X-1" (teaser)

Tour dates

Box office score data

Personnel
 Geddy Lee – vocals, bass, keyboards
 Alex Lifeson – guitar, backing vocals
 Neil Peart – drums

References

Citations

Sources
 
 
 
 
 
 

Rush (band) concert tours
1991 concert tours
1992 concert tours
Concert tours of North America
Concert tours of the United States
Concert tours of Canada
Concert tours of Europe
Concert tours of the United Kingdom
Concert tours of France
Concert tours of Germany
Concert tours of the Netherlands